KUOK-CA, VHF analog channel 11, was a low-powered television station licensed to Norman, Oklahoma, United States. The station was owned by Equity Broadcasting.

History
The station first signed on the air in 1997 as KDSA-LP, carrying programming from The Worship Network, which had already broadcast on KMNZ (channel 62, now KOPX-TV) before and after that station became the market's Pax TV (now Ion Television) owned-and-operated station. In 2000, KDSA affiliated with religious broadcaster Daystar. After the affiliation switch to Univision was announced, Daystar programming was moved to upstart O&O station KOCM (channel 46) in December 2003. In the summer of 2004, the station requested to the Federal Communications Commission to have its call letters changed to KUOK-CA, which was made official that fall.

The station became a Univision affiliate on May 8, 2004, as part of a six-station bi-state network then known as "Univision Arkansas-Oklahoma" which also included KUOK (channel 36, to which KUOK-CA served as a translator) and the three other low-power stations that also Equity acquired to become its translators (K69EK (channel 69, later KWDW-LP, KUOK-LP, KOCY-LP, and now KOCY-LD on channel 48), KCHM-LP (channel 36, now KUOK-CD), and Sulphur-based KOKT-LP (channel 20)), originally relayed Univision programming across Oklahoma via a direct simulcast from then-sister station KLRA-LP (now KKYK-CD) in Little Rock, Arkansas. In March 2005, KUOK – though still programmed via satellite from Equity's headquarters in Little Rock – discontinued the KLRA-LP simulcast, with it and its translators began carrying advertising for businesses within the Oklahoma City market and separate station promotions.

KUOK-CA broke off from the Univision simulcast on May 30, 2007, when the station switched to LAT TV as part of a new affiliation deal between the network and Equity. LAT TV ceased operations in 2008, and KUOK went silent afterward. On June 18, 2010, the FCC canceled KUOK-CA's license.

References

Equity Media Holdings
UOK-CA
UOK-CA
Television channels and stations established in 1997
1997 establishments in Oklahoma
Television channels and stations disestablished in 2010
2010 disestablishments in Oklahoma
Defunct television stations in the United States
UOK-CA